Clement Coke (died 24 May 1629) was an English politician who sat in the House of Commons at various times between 1614 and 1629.

Coke was the son of  Sir Edward Coke, Chief Justice, and his wife Bridget Paston, daughter of John Paston of Norwich. In 1614, Coke was elected Member of Parliament for Clitheroe.  He was elected MP for Dunwich in 1621. Cooke reportedly assaulted the new MP for Hertfordshire, Sir Charles Morrison, on the Parliament stairs. After an enquiry, Cooke was imprisoned in the Tower of London for the attack.

In 1626 he was elected MP for Aylesbury and sat until March 1629 when King Charles decided to rule without parliament, and then did so for eleven years.  Coke died two months after the dissolution of the last parliament.
 
Coke married  Sarah Reddish, daughter of Alexander Reddish  of Reddish, Lancashire. She brought to him Longford Hall, Derbyshire. His son Edward was created a baronet in 1641.

References

 

Year of birth missing
1629 deaths
English MPs 1614
English MPs 1621–1622
English MPs 1626
English MPs 1628–1629